Jakob Lemmer (born 26 April 2000) is a German professional footballer who plays as a right midfielder for 3. Liga side Dynamo Dresden.

Career
Born in Giessen, Lemmer played youth football for Eintracht Frankfurt before moving to Kickers Offenbach at the age of 16. He signed his first professional contract in the 2019–20 season. He spent the 2021–22 season on loan at Regionalliga West rivals Rot-Weiß Koblenz, scoring 6 goals and making 6 assists in 35 appearances. During the 2022–23 season, he became an undisputed starter for Kickers Offenbach, scoring 9 goals and making 4 assists in 22 appearances.

In January 2023, Lemmer joined 3. Liga side Dynamo Dresden. With half a year left on Lemmer's contract with Kickers Offenbach, Dynamo Dresden paid an undisclosed transfer fee.

References

External links
 

Living people
2000 births
Sportspeople from Giessen
German footballers
Association football midfielders
3. Liga players
Regionalliga players
Kickers Offenbach players
FC Rot-Weiß Koblenz players
Dynamo Dresden players